Two ships of the Royal Navy have been named HMS Montbretia :

  an  sloop launched in 1917 and sold in 1921
 , a  launched in 1941, transferred to Norway as HNoMS Montbretia and sunk in 1942

Royal Navy ship names